Events from the year 1914 in Argentina.

Incumbents
 President: Roque Sáenz Peña and Victorino de la Plaza
 Vice president: Victorino de la Plaza

Governors
 Buenos Aires Province: Luis García (until 1 May); Marcelino Ugarte (from 1 May)
 Cordoba: Ramón J. Cárcano
 Mendoza Province: Rufino Ortega Ozamis (until 6 March); Francisco S. Álvarez (from 6 March)

Vice Governors
 Buenos Aires Province: vacant (until 1 May); Vicente Peralta Alvear (starting 1 May)

Events
March 22 - Argentine legislative election, 1914

Births
 September 15 – Adolfo Bioy Casares, writer, journalist, and translator

Deaths
August 9 - Roque Sáenz Peña

References

 
Years of the 20th century in Argentina
1910s in Argentina
Argentina
Argentina
History of Argentina (1880–1916)